Satyanweshi is a 2013 Bengali mystery-thriller film directed by Rituparno Ghosh and produced by Shrikant Mohta and Mahendra Soni. This was Ghosh's last full-length film as a director. Indian film director Sujoy Ghosh portrayed the character Byomkesh Bakshi in this film.

Plot 

Maharaja Arunangshu, the ruler of a princely state named Balabantpur, had made a wish list on his death bed in the presence of Dewan Chandrashekhar, the family physician Kaligati and the High Priest. It laid down certain conditions under which his son Himangshu could inherit the kingdom. The first condition forbade Himangshu to marry a non-Hindu girl, and the second demanded a legitimate heir within three years of his marriage. Bound by his father's conditions of succession, Himangshu is compelled to marry Alaka, an aspiring actress. A year and half into the marriage, Harinath, the young palace librarian, who is friendly with Alaka, disappears without any trace. This mystery occasions the arrival of the sleuth Byomkesh and his author friend Ajit to Balabantpur. The visit, however, is under the pretext of an invitation to take part in a hunting expedition. In the course of their stay, they unravel many secrets involving the residents of the palace and also about the topography of Balabantpur. Byomkesh is particularly intrigued by the character of Kaligati, the royal physician, and uncovers several clues which connect Kaligati with the disappearance of Harinath. It is discovered that Alaka is sexually frigid. But she was anxious to continue the bloodline of Himangshu. Not getting any sexual pleasure from his wife, Himangshu was attracted towards Leela, the daughter of Kaligati. On a previous hunting expedition Alaka had sent Leela with Himanghshu instead of herself accompanying him. Thus Leela became pregnant with his child. But Harinath the librarian loved Leela and wanted to marry her despite knowing she was carrying Himangshu's child. Kaligati found this inconvenient as Leela's son would then be officially known as Harinath's son and not Himangshu's. Kaligati wanted to be the grandfather of the royal offspring. Thus he orchestrated Harinath's drowning in quicksand on the night when he discovered Harinath had married Leela. The ensuing story revolves around the detective's unveiling of Kaligati as the culprit behind the mystery of Balabantpur.

Cast 
 Sujoy Ghosh as Byomkesh Bakshi
 Anindya Chatterjee as Ajit Bandyopadhyay
 Indraneil Sengupta as Himangshu
 Sibaji Bandyopadhyay as Kaligati
 Arpita Chatterjee as Aloka
 Anirban Ghosh as Horinath  
 Anindya Bandyopadhyay as Arunangsho
 Sanjoy Nag as Diwan Chandrasekhar
 Anandi Ghosh as Leela

Filming 
Satyanweshi was Rituparno Ghosh's last full-length film as a director. Before his death on 30 May 2013, he completed shooting of most of the film. The remaining work of the film was done by Ghosh's core team, though Sujoy Ghosh, the lead actor of the film, who is a director himself proposed the same. The filming was done at the Gain Rajbari in Dhanyakuria

References

External links 
 

2010s Bengali-language films
2013 films
Indian detective films
Films directed by Rituparno Ghosh
Bengali-language Indian films
Byomkesh Bakshi films
Films based on works by Saradindu Bandopadhyay